Swimmer puppy syndrome is a rare condition in which a puppy is unable to physically stand or walk, but instead lies flat on its chest and abdomen with hind legs extended behind and its forelegs extended to the front and/or sides. The only motion the puppy is capable of is paddling its limbs as though it is swimming. The British Bulldog suffers from this condition more often than any other breed. This condition is thought to be caused either by congenital defects, heredity, and/or environmental factors that prevent a puppy's muscles from developing.

Signs and symptoms
At one week of age, the legs will appear to be permanently splayed to the sides. By three weeks of age, the puppy will not have the ability to stand and walk like its littermates.

The chest may appear flattened instead of round, leading to difficulty breathing. Swimmer puppies are also often lethargic.

Treatments
If early intervention such as physiotherapy is given, the legs of the dog should straighten out.

References

Further reading 
 
  "Swimmer puppy or kitten syndrome" at pp. 419–420.
 
 
 
 
 
 
 
 
 

Syndromes in dogs